The 1993 DFB-Supercup, known as the Panasonic DFB-Supercup for sponsorship purposes, was the 7th DFB-Supercup, an annual football match contested by the winners of the previous season's Bundesliga and DFB-Pokal competitions.

The match was played at the Ulrich-Haberland-Stadion in Leverkusen, and contested by league champions Werder Bremen and cup winners Bayer Leverkusen. Bremen won the match 7–6 on penalties, after a 2–2 draw, claiming their second title.

Teams

Match

Details

See also
 1992–93 Bundesliga
 1992–93 DFB-Pokal

References

1993
SV Werder Bremen matches
Bayer 04 Leverkusen matches
1993–94 in German football cups
DFB-Supercup 1993